Kayaapu (also spelled Kahyapu or Khayapu) is a village on Enggano Island, Indonesia. Along with Barhau, it is one of the two main villages of the island. It is located roughly 500 kilometers from Jakarta.

References

Populated places in Bengkulu